Diexi (Chinese: 叠溪; Pinyin: Diéxī) is a town in Mao County, Ngawa Prefecture, Sichuan, China. As of 2000, it has a population of 2,697.

The old town of Diexi was destroyed in the 1933 Diexi earthquake and sank into Diexi Lake. On 24 June 2017, a landslide occurred in Xinmo Village (新磨村), Diexi.

References

Towns in Sichuan
Ngawa Tibetan and Qiang Autonomous Prefecture
Destroyed towns